The 2005 Tour de Corse was the 14th round of the 2005 World Rally Championship. It took place between October 21, 2005 and October 23, 2005 at Ajaccio, France. Citroën's Sébastien Loeb won the race, his 19th win in the World Rally Championship. Loeb made history by winning all twelve stages in the, which marked the first time a driver had won every stage of a WRC rally.

Results

References 

Corse, Tour de
2005
Corse, Tour de
Corse, Tour de